Jacome or Jácome is a Portuguese and Spanish surname and a given name. Notable people with the name include:
Jácome de Bruges (born 1418), Flemish businessman
Jacome Gonsalves (1676–1742), Sri Lankan priest and missionary
Jácome Ratton (1736–1820), Franco-Portuguese businessman
Antía Jácome (born 1999), Spanish sprint canoeist
Antônio Jácome (born 1962), Brazilian politician
Arella Jácome (born 2004), Ecuadorian politician
Dionisio Pérez-Jácome Friscione (born 1967), Mexican economist
Dolores Isabel Jacome Silva (born 1991), Portuguese footballer
Elías Jácome (1945–1999), Ecuadorian football referee
Fernando Jácome (born 1980), Colombian freestyle swimmer
Jason Jacome (born 1970), American baseball pitcher
Juan Jácome (born 1960), Ecuadorian footballer
Leon Jacome, an alias of Ramón Mercader (1913–1978), Spanish communist and Soviet spy
Mariela Jácome (born 1996), American-born Ecuadorian footballer
Rafael Jácome de Andrade (1851–1900), Portuguese military figure and politician
Santiago Jácome (born 1973), Ecuadorian footballer
Tomasa Yarhui Jacomé (born 1968), Bolivian lawyer and politician

Portuguese-language surnames
Spanish-language surnames